Curiosity & the Cat is a 1999 German thriller crime drama film directed by Christian Alvart and starring Konstantin Graudus, Detlef Lutz, Andreas Erfurth, and Nadeshda Brennicke.

Plot 
A German writer gets curious about the violent and sado-masochistic ongoings in his neighbour's apartments and drills holes in the walls to gain more insight. He becomes consumed by his curiosity for their seemingly more interesting lives, simultaneously neglecting his relationship with his British girlfriend.

Production
The film was shot in Berlin.

The tagline for the film was "Watch Your Neighbor".

Henri is seen washing himself several times in the movie usually by Christian Alvart's typical shot: He is reflected by three mirrors, effectively showing him four times from all angles.

Aphex Twin's song Come to Daddy is used twice in the film.

The legal disclaimer reads: "Die hier dargestellten Personen und Ereignisse beruhen allein auf den Auswüchsen eines kranken Geistes und sind so nie passiert. Alle Übereinstimmungen mit real Personen oder Geschehnissen sind zufällig und haben nix zu bedeuten." [The persons and events depicted here are solely based on the excesses/experiences of a sick mind and never have happened this way. All correspondences with real persons or events are coincidental and actually mean nothing]. And further: "Bei den Dreharbeiten zu diesem Film sind weder Tiere noch kleine Kinder zu Schaden gekommen." [Neither animals nor small children were harmed during the making of this film].

Cast
 Konstantin Graudus as Henri Kappes
 Detlef Lutz as Kriminalhauptkommissar Gehler
 Andreas Erfurth as Kriminalkommissar Wosniak
 Nadeshda Brennicke as Paula (as Nadeshda Brennecke)
 Thomas D as Kurt
 Klaus Zmorek as Flagg
 Heribert Czerniak as Jelinsk
 Jarreth Merz as Hortek
 Domenico D'Ambrosio as Stritzl
 Sandra Leonhard as Roke
 Natascha Graf as Julie
 Ben Hecker as Dr. Bieser
 Clemens Gerhard as the assistant

Release
The film premiered in Germany on 21 January 1999 at the Max Ophüls Festival and in Iceland on 11 November 2000.

References

External links 
 

1999 films
1999 crime thriller films
1999 independent films
1990s psychological thriller films
German independent films
1990s German-language films
German crime thriller films
Films directed by Christian Alvart
Films about writers
1999 directorial debut films
1990s German films